Christopher Arnold Terreri (born November 15, 1964) is an American professional ice hockey coach and former player. He was inducted as a charter member of the Rhode Island Hockey Hall of Fame in 2018.

Playing career
Terreri was drafted by the New Jersey Devils in the fifth round (85th overall) of the 1983 NHL Entry Draft. He attended Providence College from 1982 to 1986, and was the MVP of the 1985 Hockey East postseason tournament following a 2–1 double-overtime victory over top-seeded Boston College at the Providence Civic Center, and the MVP of the 1985 NCAA Men's Ice Hockey Championship, despite a 2–1 loss in the championship game to RPI at Joe Louis Arena.

He is a two-time Stanley Cup Champion with New Jersey, having won his first title in 1995, and his second Cup in 2000. Over his career, he played for the Devils, the San Jose Sharks, the Chicago Blackhawks and the New York Islanders. He wore a non-traditional mask. 

While initially lost to the Minnesota Wild in the 2000 NHL Expansion Draft.  He was re-acquired from the Minnesota Wild with Minnesota's 9th round choice (later traded to Tampa Bay - Thomas Ziegler) in the 2000 Entry Draft for Brad Bombardir.

Coaching career
In 2001, he became an assistant coach of the Albany River Rats, the New Jersey Devils' farm team. During the 2005–06 season, Terreri made his return to professional ice hockey against the Hershey Bears where, in two periods, he made 27 saves and allowed four goals. It was the two-time Stanley Cup winner's first action since the 2000–01 season, when he played for the New York Islanders.

On July 8, 2017, Terreri was relieved from his duties as goaltending coach for the New Jersey Devils. On August 23, 2017, Terreri was hired by the New York Islanders as a goaltending development coach.

Personal life
Terreri was born in Providence, Rhode Island, and was raised in nearby Warwick.

Terreri and his wife Jennifer have two children, Celia Rose and Jillian Jayne.

Awards and honors

Career statistics

Regular season and playoffs

International

References

External links

1964 births
Living people
Albany River Rats coaches
Albany River Rats players
American men's ice hockey goaltenders
American people of Italian descent
Chicago Blackhawks players
Ice hockey coaches from Rhode Island
Ice hockey players at the 1988 Winter Olympics
Indianapolis Ice players
Maine Mariners players
New Jersey Devils coaches
New Jersey Devils draft picks
New Jersey Devils players
New York Islanders coaches
New York Islanders players
Olympic ice hockey players of the United States
Providence Friars men's ice hockey players
San Jose Sharks players
Sportspeople from Providence, Rhode Island
Stanley Cup champions
Utica Devils players
AHCA Division I men's ice hockey All-Americans
Ice hockey people from Providence, Rhode Island